The International Federation of Air Line Pilots' Associations (IFALPA) is an international not-for-profit organization of national pilots' associations. IFALPA was founded in April 1948 and is based in Montreal, Quebec, Canada.

History 
After the end of the Second World War as international civil aviation began to re-establish itself, pilots around the world realized that their associations could not protect them across national boundaries. Furthermore, they did not have a voice at the newly formed International Civil Aviation Organization. At a meeting in London in April 1948 a conference of pilot associations was held that formed the International Federation of Air Line Pilots' Associations. IFALPA was located in the UK from 1948 to 2012. In 2012 the Federation established its headquarters in Montreal, Canada, the World Capital of Civil Aviation, and is located near ICAO.

Membership 
IFALPA claims to represent "more than 100,000 pilots in the Member Associations of nearly 100 countries worldwide" but lists only 74 member associations on its website.

Connections with ICAO 
IFALPA has a Permanent Observer status at ICAO's Air Navigation Commission (ANC) and is also Observer to the ICAO Council. Through its Subject Matter Experts in its Standing Committees in regulatory, industrial, and safety/technical areas, IFALPA is represented on numerous ICAO Panels and Task Forces to provide pilot input into regulations, design criteria, Air Traffic Management and Airport requirements just to name a few.

Current Leadership (2021)

President
As of 2019: Captain Jack Netskar.

See also 
European Cockpit Association

References

External links 
 

 
Civil aviation
Trade unions established in 1948
Airline pilots' trade unions
International organizations based in Canada
Organizations based in Montreal